The Odeon of Herodes Atticus (Greek: Ωδείο Ηρώδου του Αττικού; also called Herodeion or Herodion; Greek: Ηρώδειο) is a stone Roman theatre structure located on the southwest slope of the Acropolis of Athens, Greece. The building was completed in AD 161 and then renovated in 1950.

Ancient times

It was built in AD 161 by Herodes Atticus in memory of his Roman wife, Aspasia Annia Regilla. It was originally a steep-sloped theatre with a three-story stone front wall and a wooden roof made of expensive cedar of Lebanon timber. It was used as a venue for music concerts with a capacity of 5,000. It lasted intact until it was destroyed and left in ruins by the Heruli in AD 267.

Modern events

The audience stands and the orchestra (stage) were restored using Pentelic marble in the 1950s. Since then it has been the main venue of the Athens Festival, which runs from May through October each year, featuring a variety of acclaimed Greek as well as International performances.

In 1957 Maria Callas performed at the Odeon as part of the Athens Festival and in the same year Edith Hamilton was pronounced an honorary citizen of Athens at ninety years of age. In May 1962 Frank Sinatra gave two Benefit concerts for the city of Athens. The Odeon of Herodes Atticus was the venue for the Miss Universe 1973 pageant. Another memorable performance at the Odeon of Herodes Atticus was given by the Greek singer Nana Mouskouri in 1984; after 20 years of absence she returned to her country. Luciano Pavarotti performed at the Odeon twice, in 1991 and in 2004. Vangelis' Mythodea premiered at Odeon of Herodes Atticus in July 1993 and the venue hosted Yanni's Live at the Acropolis performance in September 1993. Sting performed at the venue during his Mercury Falling Tour on May 17, 1996. In June 2018 he returned for two more concerts. Mario Frangoulis has performed at the historic theatre with Yannis Markopoulos' and directed by Elias Malandris, Orpheus in 1996 and also played the role of Erotokritos in his work based on Vitsentzos Kornaros' Erotokritos. He also performed 'Axion Esti' poem by Odysseus Elytis music by Mikis Theodorakis and conducted by the composer himself in May 1998 to benefit Elpida foundation for children suffering from cancer. Elton John performed two concerts at the venue during his Medusa Tour in 2000. In June 2008 Sylvie Guillem performed Boléro in company with the Tokyo Ballet as part of the Athens Festival. In September 2010, tenor Andrea Bocelli held a concert at the Odeon to raise funds for cancer research. In the Year 2012 Mario Frangoulis performed the leading role in Carl Orff's Carmina Burana at the Herodes Atticus theatre. In 2020 the first art exhibition was held on the site, by Greek artist Dionisis Kavallieratos, entitled 'Disoriented Dance / Misled Planet' organised by NEON Organization and the Athens and Epidaurus Festival. 

Other artists who have performed at the Odeon of Herodes Atticus include Plácido Domingo, José Carreras, Montserrat Caballé, Alicia de Larrocha, Roger Woodward the Bolshoi Ballets, Calexico, Maurice Béjart, Joaquín Cortés, Paco de Lucía, Diana Ross, Liza Minnelli, Goran Bregovic, Steve Harley (without the usual band, Cockney Rebel, but accompanied by an 80-piece orchestra), Jean Michel Jarre, Ennio Morricone, Jethro Tull, Karolos Koun, Mikis Theodorakis, Manos Hatzidakis, Nikos Koundouros, Patti Smith, Sivert Høyem, Spiros Evangelatos, Fairuz, Yannis Markopoulos, George Dalaras, Haris Alexiou, Marinella, Foo Fighters, Yann Tiersen, Dionysis Savopoulos, Leonidas Kavakos, Kathryn Morgan, Dead Can Dance, Florence and the Machine and many other important artists and artistic organisations.

See also
 List of concert halls
 List of contemporary amphitheaters

References

External links
● Odeon of Herodes Atticus: History, location, how and when to visit. Text in English, photos.
The southern slope of the Acropolis and the theatre itself, Hellenic Ministry of Culture.
Video: Haris Alexiou performance at the Odeon of Herodes Atticus in 1994, directed by Mauro Bolognini; in this video a part dedicated to her collaboration with Manos Hadjidakis, who had died a few days before the concert.

Buildings and structures completed in the 2nd century
Acropolis of Athens
Landmarks in Athens
Ancient Greek buildings and structures in Athens
Ancient Roman buildings and structures in Greece
Theatres in Athens